Adelphicos newmanorum, the Middle American burrowing snake, is a colubrid snake found in Mexico.

References

Adelphicos
Endemic reptiles of Mexico
Reptiles described in 1950
Taxa named by Edward Harrison Taylor